Life Against Death: The Psychoanalytical Meaning of History (1959; second edition 1985) is a book by the American classicist Norman O. Brown, in which the author offers a radical analysis and critique of the work of Sigmund Freud, tries to provide a theoretical rationale for a nonrepressive civilization, explores parallels between psychoanalysis and Martin Luther's theology, and draws on revolutionary themes in western religious thought, especially the body mysticism of Jakob Böhme and William Blake. It was the result of an interest in psychoanalysis that began when the philosopher Herbert Marcuse suggested to Brown that he should read Freud.

The book became famous when Norman Podhoretz recommended it to the critic Lionel Trilling, and over fifty-thousand copies had been sold by 1966. It has been compared to works such as Marcuse's Eros and Civilization (1955) and the philosopher Michel Foucault's Madness and Civilization (1961), and Brown's objectives have been seen as being the same as Foucault's. Though Life Against Death has been called one of the great nonfiction works of the 20th century, some critics have found it of lesser weight than Eros and Civilization, and Brown has been criticized for misinterpreting Freud's theories. It has been suggested that, despite his objectives, Brown's arguments imply that sexual repression is biologically inevitable. Brown later called parts of Life Against Death "quite immature" and wrote of his Love's Body (1966) that it was written to confuse any followers he acquired due to the book and destroy its positions.

Summary

Brown praised The Interpretation of Dreams (1899) as one of the great applications and extensions of the Socratic axiom "know thyself", but criticized Totem and Taboo (1913), writing that in that work Freud correlates psycho-sexual stages of development with stages of history, thereby seeing history as a "process of growing up". Brown saw that view as a "residue of eighteenth-century optimism and rationalism" and considered it inadequate as both history and psychoanalysis. He credited the philosopher Stuart Hampshire with providing an acute comparison between Freud and the philosopher Baruch Spinoza in Spinoza (1951), but wrote that Hampshire fails to recognize important differences between the two, such as Freud's dualism.

Background and publication history
Brown, whose background was in classical studies, became interested in psychoanalysis because of Herbert Marcuse, a philosopher associated with the Institute for Social Research based in Frankfurt. Marcuse had little direct concern with Freud while in Frankfurt, but devoted more attention to psychoanalysis in the 1950s, and in 1953 suggested to Brown that he should read Freud.

Seeking a passage to a "post-Marxist world", Brown began his turn to psychoanalysis partly because he had become disenchanted with politics after the failure of Henry Wallace's 1948 Presidential candidacy. In Life Against Death, Brown wrote that he had begun a careful study of Freud in 1953, because he felt the need to reconsider both human nature and the human race's future prospects. Commenting that he had inherited from Protestantism a conscience which dictated that intellectual work should be directed toward ending or minimizing human suffering, Brown addressed the book to everyone ready to consider new ideas and possibilities. Brown proposed a synthesis of psychoanalysis, anthropology, and history, calling the analyst Géza Róheim's efforts in that direction pioneer work of significance second only to Freud's. Brown also commended Marcuse's Eros and Civilization (1955) as, "the first book, after Wilhelm Reich's ill-fated adventures, to reopen the possibility of the abolition of repression."

According to the historian Paul Robinson, Radicals such as Reich and Róheim represented a minority current of opinion within psychoanalysis, which by the 1940s was viewed as fundamentally conservative by the European and American intellectual community. Critics outside the psychoanalytic movement agreed in seeing Freud as a conservative. The left-wing psychoanalyst Erich Fromm had argued that several aspects of psychoanalytic theory served the interests of political reaction in his The Fear of Freedom (1942), an assessment confirmed by sympathetic writers on the right. The sociologist Philip Rieff, in Freud: The Mind of the Moralist (1959), portrayed Freud as a man who admirably urged men to make the best of an inevitably unhappy fate.

In the 1950s, Marcuse and Brown, along with Trilling in Freud and the Crisis of Our Culture (1955), challenged this interpretation of Freud. They believed that Freud showed that a high price has been paid for civilization, and that Freud's critical element was to be found in his late metahistorical studies, works considered unscientific by orthodox analysts and reactionary by the neo-Freudians. Marcuse and Brown shared a similar general outlook and devoted the most attention to the same Freudian concepts. They saw Freud's greatness in his metahistorical analysis of "the general neurosis of mankind", argued that modern man is sick with the burdens of sexual repression and uncontrolled aggression, attempted to make explicit the hidden critical trend in psychoanalysis that promised a nonrepressive civilization as a solution to the dilemma of modern unhappiness, and accepted the most radical and discouraging of Freud's psychological assumptions: the pervasive role of sexuality and the existence of the death instinct. Brown, unlike Marcuse, had strong mystical inclinations and drew on revolutionary themes in western religious thought, especially the body mysticism of Böhme and Blake.

Life Against Death was first published in the United States by Wesleyan University Press in 1959. In 1959, the book was published in the United Kingdom by Routledge and Kegan Paul. Sphere Books published editions in 1968 and 1970. In 1985, a second edition with an introduction by the historian Christopher Lasch was published.

Reception

Brown's assessment of the book

Brown later expressed dissatisfaction with Life Against Death, referring to its chapter on "Language and Eros" as "quite immature." He observed that the book, "records the first revision of my historical identity, from Marx to Marx and Freud", a process which occurred because his first "historical identity", Marxism, had been "wrecked in the frozen landscapes of the Cold War, the defeat of the simplistic hopes for a better world that inspired the Henry Wallace campaign for the Presidency in 1948." Brown, who saw Louis Zukofsky's poetry as anticipating the ideas of both Life Against Death and Love's Body (1966), has called Life Against Death "my first exuberant surge of premature post-Marxist energy", writing that in it he had wagered his "intellectual life on the idea of finding in Freud what was missing in Marx." Brown "found in Freud's analysis of the pathological dimension of human desires the basis for a post-Marxist critique of capitalism." Commenting on his intellectual development, Brown noted that, "My Marxist background had given me a healthy prejudice against moneymaking. Imagine my excitement when I discovered Sandor Ferenczi's article 'The Ontogenesis of the Interest in Money'; with its immortal conclusion, 'After what has been said money is seen to be nothing other than deodorized, dehydrated shit that has been made to shine.'"

That this shift of Brown's interests toward psychoanalysis led to the writing of Love's Body, which concluded that "there is only poetry", showed, according to Brown, that pursuing the implications of Freud's ideas consistently led to the breakdown of "categories of traditional 'rationality' still accepted as authoritative by both Marx and Freud; that massive breakdown...which Nietzsche baptized with the name of Dionysus." Brown wrote that he now realized that he did not really know what he was saying when he called for "Dionysian consciousness" in the last chapter of Life Against Death. Brown added that it was clear to him in that work "that at that deep level which can only be expressed in myth or metaphor, Freud's 'instinct theory' needed to be remythologized in terms of Dionysus, that is to say in terms of instinctual dialectics rather than instinctual dualism. Or, to use another metaphor, in terms of Heraclitus rather than Empedocles." Brown concluded that the last chapter of Life Against Death was disfigured by the misleading idea that the world could be 'a pastoral scene of peace and pleasure, luxe calme et volupté, Baudelaire's utopian image invoked by Marcuse in Eros and Civilization'''."

Mainstream mediaLife Against Death received a positive review from Susan Sontag in The Supplement to the Columbia Spectator, and was also reviewed by the philosopher Frank Meyer in National Review, and discussed by Loren Baritz in The Nation, the sociologist Edgar Z. Friedenberg in The New York Times Book Review, Ralph Flores in Library Journal, the political scientist Alan Wolfe in The New Republic, Charles Peck in Across the Board, the art critic Roger Kimball in The New Criterion, the critic George Scialabba in Bookforum, and in Time and Yale - Theatre.

Sontag wrote that Life Against Death and Eros and Civilization represented a "new seriousness about Freudian ideas" and exposed most previous writing on Freud in the United States as irrelevant or superficial. She praised Brown for his boldness in discussing fundamental problems "about the hypocrisy of our culture, about art, money, religion, work, about sex and the motives of the body", and considered his work an advance in understanding "the revolutionary implications of sexuality in contemporary society." She credited Brown with showing that Freud's "psychological categories" are "political categories" and that "psychological categories are also bodily categories", with carefully pointing out the limits of Freud's thought, and with providing "an analysis of the whole range of Freudian theory, a theory of instinct and culture, and a set of historical case studies." Though she considered Brown's "commitment to Protestantism as the herald of a culture which has transcended sublimation ... historically dubious", she wrote that by placing his ideas in the framework of Christian eschatology Brown raised issues of great importance and opened the possibility of a "psychoanalytic theory of history which does not simply reduce cultural history to the psychology of individuals", working out an original point of view that was simultaneously historical and psychological, and forcing a reconsideration of the meaning of eschatology. She concluded that, "The highest praise one can give to Brown's book is that, apart from its all-important attempt to penetrate and further the insights of Freud, it is the first major attempt to forumulate an eschatology of immanence in the seventy years since Nietzsche." 

Baritz described Life Against Death as a good example of "metahistory". Friedenberg wrote that Michel Foucault's Madness and Civilization (1961) shared a "kinship in mood if not in tone or method" to Life Against Death and its "strident paean to the primal id." Flores credited John O. King with showing that Life Against Death, "in its very recommendation of play (as an article of faith), fits into the ascetic schema it would deny." Peck described Life Against Death as "arguably one of the significant books of the second half of the century." Kimball described the book as a "dense, learned academic tract that blends Freud, Marx, idealist philosophy, and mysticism East and West in a preposterous but intoxicating brew." He wrote that Brown had a gift for "infusing mystic pronouncements with a radical, anti-bourgeois animus and a febrile erotic charge" and that his work was "tremendous hit on American campuses, where the homeless radicalism of irresponsible affluence made all manner of utopian schemes seem attractive." Kimball wrote that Brown's views parallel those of Marcuse, despite the difference of tone between the two thinkers. He dismissed the ideas of both Brown and Marcuse as false and harmful.

Scialabba called the book "rewardingly adventurous".Time wrote that Life Against Death was "largely ignored by both critics and the public". However, it added that following the publication of Love's Body, some important critics belatedly reviewed Life Against Death and The Observer placed it "on two outstanding-books lists." According to Time, there were more than fifty-thousand copies of Life Against Death in print as of 1966, and the book, like the sociologist David Riesman's The Lonely Crowd (1950) and the fantasy writer J. R. R. Tolkien's The Lord of the Rings (1954–1955), had become "one of the underground books that undergraduates feel they must read to be with it". Time also described the book as "an undergraduate's delight".

Scientific and academic journals
The book was also discussed by the sociologist Robert Neelly Bellah in Sociological Inquiry, the psychoanalyst Nancy Chodorow in Theory & Society, Alan W. Dyer in the Journal of Economic Issues, Michael Beard in Edebiyat: Journal of Middle Eastern Literatures, Christopher Shultis in Perspectives of New Music, Matthew Day in Method & Theory in the Study of Religion, Basit Kareem Iqbal in Islam & Science, Nigel Dodd in the Journal of Classical Sociology, and R. R. Reno in First Things.

Chodorow credited Brown and Marcuse with providing the most important expression of a view that accepts drive theory and maintains that theories such as Neo-Freudianism and ego psychology undermine "psychoanalytic insight into the drives, repression, and the unconscious." Though she found their views "powerful and at times attractive", she questioned their interpretations of Freud. She argued that their social theories are a "radical individualist" view that sees social relations an unnecessary form of constraint, that they failed to explain how social bonds and political activity are possible, that their theories involve a "problematic view of women, gender relations, and generation", that their use of primary narcissism as a model for union with others "maintains a focus on individual gratification and denies gratification and selfhood to the other", and that they both "conflate the clinical as a source of evidence for theory with the therapeutic as a goal of psychoanalysis", with Brown being less guilty of this than Marcuse. However, she maintained that the work of Marcuse and Brown nevertheless helped suggest "a more consistent and persuasive psychoanalytic social theory and vision of social possibility." Addressing the specific problems of Brown's work, she argued that there are internal contradictions within Life Against Death, as well as contradictions between that work and Love's Body, that Brown's assertion that the infant's desire to avoid separation is a refusal to face death is a metaphorical claim that "brings irrelevant instinctual considerations into a clearly object-related and ego experience", and that despite giving theoretical primacy to drives Brown "can often be read as starting from a theory of relationship, with instincts tacked on." Though she credited Brown with providing a dual account of drives and object relations, she wrote that he "consistently underplays this component of his work" in Life Against Death.

Beard wrote that Life Against Death, with its "apocalyptic companion" Eros and Civilization, "provided one of the most influential blueprints for radical thinking in the decade which followed." Though considering Brown's discussion of "the psychoanalytic dimensions of the Reformation" important, he wrote that "it was never clear how to follow up on them". He suggested that while Brown had influenced many students, he had no true successor, and described the methods Brown used in Life Against Death as unpromising for the study of the Middle East. Shultis and Iqbal both described the book as "famous". Dodd credited Brown with making a distinctive and original contribution to "the sociological and philosophical understanding of money, credit and debt".

Reno described Life Against Death as an "ambitious" and "speculative" work that, along with Love's Body, "gave theoretical expression to the counterculture of the 1960s". He called Brown's "decision to make desire his redemptive principle was a stroke of genius." Though he considered Brown "easy to make fun of", and wrote that Brown's appeals to the "dialectical metaphysics of hope" can sound "hopelessly jejune" and that his "Dionysian ecstasies" were overwrought, he credited Brown with a "mobile metaphysical imagination" that "allowed him to recognize the larger implications of modern, naturalistic conceptions of culture" and drawing the "obvious conclusions in bold, prophetic strokes". Reno wrote that Foucault's "intellectual life was devoted to detailed studies of cultural norms oriented toward the very same goal".

Other evaluations, 1959–1991
The Situationist writer Raoul Vaneigem credited Brown with showing how Eros, understood as essentially narcissistic, can lead to union with beings in the world. The journalist Raymond de Becker dismissed Brown's theories as speculation.

Paul Robinson credited Brown and Marcuse with systematically analyzing psychoanalytic theory in order to reveal its critical implications and of going beyond Reich and Róheim in probing the dialectical subtleties of Freud's thought, thereby reaching conclusions more extreme and utopian than theirs. He found Trilling's work on Freud of lesser value. Robinson saw Brown's exploration of the radical implications of psychoanalysis as in some ways more rigorous and systematic than that of Marcuse. He noted that Life Against Death and Eros and Civilization have often been compared, but found Life Against Death more elegantly written, attributing this to Brown having a background in literature and the classics rather than philosophy and political theory. Yet while admiring the rigor and imagination of Brown's arguments, he believed that his analysis of the genesis of sexual differentiation unwittingly subverts its purpose of showing that a nonrepressive organization of sexual life is possible. Robinson argued that if tyrannical sexual organizations result from inability to accept separation or death, and if this flight from separation is in turn based on the fact of prolonged infantile dependence, then sexual repression is a biological inevitability. Brown thus, despite his objectives, offers "a counsel of despair", since his analysis of sexual repression fails to offer a theoretical rationale for a nonrepressive civilization. Brown was unable to either explain the historical rise of repressive civilization or to provide a solution to the problems of modern living. Robinson believed that while Brown's work is psychologically more radical than that of Marcuse, it is politically more timid, and failed to transform psychoanalytic theory into historical and political categories. He deemed Marcuse a finer theorist who provided a more substantial treatment of Freud. He also found the subtitle of Life Against Death, "the Psychoanalytical Meaning of History", to be "pompous and misleading".

The gay rights activist Dennis Altman, although influenced by Life Against Death, criticized aspects of the book, writing that, "There is a danger in Brown of the realities of the body dissolving into metaphysical flights, so that his concept of polymorphous perversity becomes ultimately an asexual one and he seems to envisage this not as a move to expand sexuality from its obsessive genitality but rather as the total supplanting of that genitality." The social psychologist Liam Hudson described Life Against Death as a "strange, fertile work" that presaged a collapse of the popular "infatuation with hard science". Writing in 1972, Hudson commented that while the book was neglected when first published, it was "now being read by psychologists with close attention". He suggested that the book was neglected by radicals because its publication coincided with that of Eros and Civilization. He found Eros and Civilization more reductively political and therefore less stimulating than Life Against Death. The critic Frederick Crews wrote that Brown's work was "a disservice to the important cause of applied psychoanalysis" and that Brown had become the center of a "cult" among literary humanists that needed to be challenged. He maintained that, despite Trilling's praise of Life Against Death, Brown was an unreliable interpreter of psychoanalysis. Life Against Death influenced singer Jim Morrison.

The psychoanalyst Joel Kovel considered Life Against Death less successful than Eros and Civilization. However, he was influenced by both books, noting that he encountered them at a time when his ambitions as a psychoanalyst and his political hopes were in conflict. Kovel writes that they gave him the hope that psychoanalysis could be turned away from a narrow clinical orthodoxy and toward emancipatory purposes. He saw the main difference between Marcuse and Brown as being that the former remained a historical materialist with a political emphasis, while the latter became an apolitical idealist. He believed that Marcuse and Brown's place in history is uncertain.

The historian Russell Jacoby called Life Against Death one of the boldest efforts to revitalize psychoanalysis, but believed that the work failed to "disturb its theoretical sleep." The psychotherapist Myron Sharaf criticized Brown for misinterpreting Reich, writing that while Brown presents Reich's view as being that the pregenital stages would disappear if full genitality were established, Reich actually believed that society represses both pregenital and genital sexuality, leading to the failure of some persons to reach the genital level and the vulnerability of others to regress to pregenital levels. Reich's view, according to Sharaf, was that given full genital expression, pregenital impulses and conflicts do not disappear but simply lose their significance and their power to disrupt healthy genitality. The critic Edward W. Said wrote that Life Against Death was a vanguard book at the time of its publication. Lasch described the book as "important and valuable". He considered Brown's chapter on Swift the strongest part of the book, calling it "tough, learned, witty, and inventive". He endorsed Brown's criticism of psychoanalytic critics of Swift such as Huxley and Murry, and suggested that Brown's work was in some ways superior to that of Marcuse. He credited Brown with having grasped the importance of Freud's concept of the death instinct. However, he found Brown's proposed solutions to human problems unconvincing, writing that, "We would do better to see our subjection to time as a source of moral insight as well as a limitation." He argued that Brown sometimes confused Eros with Thanatos, or "simply inverts them", and should have identified Freud's "Nirvana principle" with Thanatos rather than Eros.

The philosopher José Guilherme Merquior described Life Against Death and Foucault's Madness and Civilization as similar calls "for the liberation of the Dionysian id." The political scientist Jeffrey B. Abramson credited Brown with providing the only account of preambivalence that highlights "the Freudian concept of identification and its significance as a desire to be at one with another person." However, he criticized Brown for "seeking to achieve a final state of satisfaction that would end the self to be satisfied", a conclusion that he considered "nihilistic" and close to the views of Spinoza. Abramson attempted to follow Brown's reading of Freud, while avoiding Brown's eschatological approach. He grouped Brown's work with Marcuse's Eros and Civilization, Rieff's Freud: The Mind of the Moralist, the philosopher Paul Ricœur's Freud and Philosophy (1965), and the philosopher Jürgen Habermas's Knowledge and Human Interests (1968), arguing that they jointly placed Freud at the center of moral and philosophical inquiry.

The philosopher Roger Scruton criticized Brown, describing his proposals for sexual liberation, like those of Marcuse in Eros and Civilization, as "another expression of the alienation" he condemned and an attempt to "dress up the outlook of the alienated individual in the attributes of virtue." Stephen Frosh found Life Against Death and Eros and Civilization to be among the most important advances towards a psychoanalytic theory of art and culture, although he finds the way these works turn the internal psychological process of repression into a model for social existence as a whole to be disputable. The poet and cultural critic Wayne Koestenbaum criticized Brown for affirming the anus as "a bodily and symbolic zone" while ignoring its connection to sodomy and homosexual desire. Koestenbaum, unlike Brown, believes that to privilege the anus is to "admit the desirability of male homosexual relations."

Other evaluations, 1992–present
The critic Camille Paglia identified Life Against Death as an influence on her work of literary criticism Sexual Personae (1990). She wrote that Brown's work, along with that of the poet Allen Ginsberg and the critics Leslie Fiedler and Harold Bloom, provided her with an alternative to the New Criticism, which she considers insupportable because of its exclusion of history and psychoanalysis. She maintained that in Life Against Death and Love's Body, "the deeply learned and classically trained Brown made an unsurpassed fusion of literature, philosophy, psychoanalysis, history, and politics." She credited Brown's books with making a major impact on American culture in the 1960s, writing that along with Arnold Hauser's The Social History of Art (1951) they helped her to see Foucault as foolish. She lamented, however, that, "my generation was condemned to live out what was only imagined by the older Norman O. Brown", noting that the excesses of the 1960s lead many people to disaster. Paglia also compared Brown's work to that of Marshall McLuhan. She promoted it as an alternative to that of the philosophers Jacques Derrida and Foucault, and the psychoanalyst Jacques Lacan. She wrote that Brown, McLuhan and Fiedler understood the creative imagination and "liberated a whole generation of students to think freely and to discover their own voices." She listed Life Against Death, along with McLuhan's Understanding Media (1964) and Fiedler's Love and Death in the American Novel (1960), as influences on her development, and observed that the book was also an influence on McLuhan. She credited Brown with making daring use of Freudian ideas and described Life Against Death as "one of the great nonfiction works of the 20th century", "what Michel Foucault longed to achieve but never did", and "a tour de force of North American thought." She praised Brown's discussions of Luther and Swift and credited him with showing the connections between "ideas and physiology, projection and body-image". She also argued that Life Against Death was superior to Eros and Civilization.

The critic Diana Trilling, writing in 1993, commented that while Life Against Death was a "central document of the unruly sixties", it was "now little remembered". According to her, Lionel Trilling, though considering Brown's work important, never agreed with Brown's criticisms of traditional moral ideas or advocacy of polymorphous perversity, and their psychoanalyst friends ignored Brown's critique of civilization. The author Richard Webster compared Life Against Death to the psychoanalyst Erik Erikson's Young Man Luther (1958), noting that both works suggested similarities between Lutheran Protestantism and classical psychoanalysis. Though agreeing that there are similarities between the two, he wrote that while Protestants may be comforted by the discovery that the revealed truths perceived by Luther are in harmony with Freud's hypotheses, others may regard such a "congruence of ancient faith and modern reason" with scepticism and "ask to what extent we should regard psychoanalysis not as a scientific approach to human nature but as a disguised continuation of the Judaeo-Christian tradition." Webster described Brown's work, like that of Marcuse, Lacan, and several other modern thinkers, as "a doomed and tragic attempt to reconstruct at the level of the intellect a sensual identity which has been crucified at the level of the spontaneous and vital body."

The historian Arthur Marwick dismissed Life Against Death as, "a curious ragbag of quotations". Norman Podhoretz wrote that the book became famous partly because he recommended it to Trilling, who produced "a favorable review of this central text of the nascent cultural radicalism toward which he was in general antagonistic and which - with Mailer, Brown, and me in mind - he would dryly characterize as 'the Norman invasion.'" The philosopher Todd Dufresne compared Life Against Death to Marcuse's Eros and Civilization and Paul Goodman's Growing Up Absurd (1960) and noted that its sales figures reflected its influence: over fifty-thousand copies had been sold by 1966. Dufresne described the book as idiosyncratic and questionable. He questioned to what extent its readers actually understood the work, suggesting that many student activists might have shared the view of Morris Dickstein, to whom it meant, "not some ontological breakthrough for human nature, but probably just plain fucking, lots of it". The essayist Jay Cantor considered Life Against Death and Eros and Civilization "equally profound".

The historian Dagmar Herzog wrote that Life Against Death was, along with Eros and Civilization'', one of the most notable examples of an effort to "use psychoanalytic ideas for culturally subversive and emancipatory purposes".

References

Bibliography
Books

 
 
 
 
 
 
 
 
 
 
 
 
 
 
 
 
 
 
 
 
 
 
 
 
 
 
 
 
 
 
 
 
 

Journals

  
  
  
  
  
  
  
  
  
  
  
  
  
  
  
  
  
  
  

1959 non-fiction books
American non-fiction books
Books about death
Books about literary theory
Books about psychoanalysis
Books about Sigmund Freud
Books by Norman O. Brown
English-language books
Lutheran theology
Wesleyan University Press books